Mat Rebeaud (born 29 July 1982) is a Swiss freestyle motocross rider. He was born and raised in Payerne, Switzerland.
Mat was raised amongst a motocross family; his grandfather and father raced motocross back in 1965, and Mat started racing at a very young age.
in 2002, at the age of 20, Mat decided to chase his childhood dreams and start racing motocross professionally. Through a love of jumping Mat started practicing freestyle tricks and racing started taking a backseat to ramps and dirt hits. Freestyle soon became Mat's life, in 2005 he won the night of the jumps championship, It was the start of Mat's FMX career. Then in 2006 he won the FIM freestyle international motocross world championship.

Career Highlights 

 2008 Red Bull X-Fighters series champion
 2008 Red Bull X-Fighters Germany 1st
 2008 Red Bull X-Fighters Madrid 1st
 2008 X Games 14 Moto X Freestyle silver medal
 2008 Red Bull X-Fighters Texas 1st
 2008 Red Bull X-Fighters Rio 2nd
 2008 Red Bull X-Fighters Mexico City 1st
 2007 Red Bull X-Fighters series 2nd place
 2007 Red Bull X-Fighters Madrid 2nd
 2007 Red Bull X-Fighters Dublin 2nd
 2006 Red Bull X-Fighters Mexico City 1st
 2006 Winter X Games Moto X Best Trick silver medal
 2006 X Games 12 Moto X Best Trick silver medal
 2006 FIM Freestyle Motocross world champion
 2005 Night of the jumps championship winner

References

1982 births
Living people
Swiss motorcycle racers
People from Payerne
Freestyle motocross riders
Swiss sportsmen
Sportspeople from the canton of Vaud